Arnoud van Halen (1673, Amsterdam – 1732, Amsterdam), was an 18th-century painter from the Northern Netherlands.

Biography
According to Houbraken he painted Christoffel Pierson's portrait for his Panpoeticon Batavum (cabinet of poets), which held portraits of over 100 people by the time Houbraken was writing (1712).

According to the RKD he was also known as Arend or Aquila van Halen. He is known for portraits and engravings, also titlepages of books.

References

Arnoud van Halen portrait by Christoffel Lubienitzki at the Rijksmuseum
Arnoud van Halen on Artnet
A. van Halen at the Amsterdam City Archives

External links

1673 births
1732 deaths
18th-century Dutch painters
18th-century Dutch male artists
Dutch male painters
Painters from Amsterdam